"My Brother Sylvest'" also known as "Big Strong Man", is an American song, but often performed by English folk singers and Irish bands.

History 
My Brudda Sylvest' was written in 1908, words by Jesse Lasky and Sam Stern, music by Fred Fisher.

The song is written in an Italian-American dialect about the singer's eponymous brother, described in hyperbolic terms as a man of legendary strength capable of extraordinary feats.  The original lyric has him blowing out a house fire, pushing the ocean away to allow him to walk to Italy, killing fifty thousand [native American] Indians, and drinking the ocean dry.

A 1955 version of the sheet music states that it is "sung by Sam Stern" and "Dedicated to my friend Sam Dody".

Subsequent versions changed the references from the boxer John L. Sullivan to the "Jeffries-Johnson fight" of 1910, to American boxer Jack Dempsey, who started boxing in 1914, and even to John Conteh of Great Britain, who fought in the 1970s.

The song was popular with Canadian soldiers in World War II.

My Brudda Sylvest' has been popular in the North of England, having been performed by Mike Harding, The Houghton Weavers, Fivepenny Piece, Gary and Vera Aspey, and other Lancashire folk singers.  Lancashire comedians such as Little and Large have also performed it.

The song is also known as Big Strong Man, sung under that name by the Wolfe Tones.

Recordings
Artists and groups who have recorded the song include:
Arthur Collins & Byron Harlan, recorded in October 1908,
The Wolfe Tones, on their 1969 album Rifles of the I.R.A.
Mike Harding, as a 1976 single
Houghton Weavers, on their 1978 Album Sit Thi Deawn 
Orthodox Celts, on their 1996 album Muzičke paralele
Brobdingnagian Bards, on their 2002 album Songs of Ireland
Carbon Leaf, on their 2003 album 5 Alive!
Derek Warfield, on his 2005 album Songs for the Bhoys
Blaggards, on their 2005 album Standards

References

1908 songs
American songs